Max Crow (born 7 January 1956) is a former Australian rules footballer in the Victorian Football League.

He played mostly as a key forward or ruckman, he was a good mark and long kick. Recruited from the western Victorian town of Underbool, outside Essendon's recruitment zone, he made his league debut for the Bombers in 1974 and spent a number of years at the club as one of its favourites.

He then crossed to St Kilda in 1983, winning the club's best and fairest award in his first year there, before finishing with one year at Footscray in 1986.

External links

Trevor Barker Award winners
St Kilda Football Club players
Essendon Football Club players
Western Bulldogs players
Living people
1956 births
Australian rules footballers from Victoria (Australia)